East Beach Station (or US Coast Guard Station-St. Simons Island or Historic Coast Guard Station) is a station of the U.S. Coast Guard in St. Simons, Georgia, United States, located at 4201 1st Street. It was built in 1936 as a part of the Works Progress Administration initiated by President Franklin D. Roosevelt. The station is one of the forty-five originally built under President Roosevelt, and is one of the few that have survived to this day.

East Beach Station is now operated by the Coastal Georgia Historical Society as the World War II Home Front Museum: Coastal Georgia at War, which brings to life Coastal Georgia's contributions during World War II through the eyes of residents of small communities like Brunswick and St. Simons, in Glynn County.

The Coastal Georgia Historical Society also operates the St. Simons Island Lighthouse and adjacent A. W. Jones Heritage Center on St. Simons Island.

The station was added to the National Register of Historic Places in 1998.

References 

Coastal Georgia Historical Society: Museums
Coastal Georgia Historical Society: History of the East Beach Station

External links
 Coast Guard/East Beach County Park
 World War II Homefront Museum
 

Buildings and structures in Glynn County, Georgia
United States Coast Guard stations
Works Progress Administration in Georgia (U.S. state)
Museums in Glynn County, Georgia
Maritime museums in Georgia (U.S. state)
Natural history museums in Georgia (U.S. state)
Colonial Revival architecture in Georgia (U.S. state)
Buildings and structures completed in 1936
St. Simons, Georgia